Clanculus mauritianus is a species of sea snail, a marine gastropod mollusk in the family Trochidae, the top snails.

Description
The height of the shell attains 9 mm, its diameter 12 mm. A pale brownish-pink-coloured Clanculus, with obscure pink spotting basally. It is depressedly conical, narrowly umbilicate, the umbilical region coarsely crenate. It is six- or seven-whorled, the three lowest whorls possessing, firstly, three rows of close spiral fine granules followed by others which have a fine spiral line dividing them, the interstices being very finely obliquely striate. Next, on the body whorl, below the periphery, the many—about 13—spiral rows of granules are quite close together, with no intermediary lines. The aperture is obliquely rotund. The outer lip is a little effuse, with four or five spiral short lirae just within the orifice. The columella is plicatulate above, and with a strong toothlike plait at the base.

Distribution
This marine species occurs in the Indian Ocean off Mauritius and Réunion in the Mascarene Bassin.

References

 Drivas, J.; Jay, M. (1987). Coquillages de La Réunion et de l'Île Maurice. Collection Les Beautés de la Nature. Delachaux et Niestlé: Neuchâtel. . 159 pp.

External links
 

mauritianus
Gastropods described in 1909